The Northern Salzburg Alps (Salzburger Nordalpen in German) are a mountain range located in Austria.

Geography 
Administratively the range belongs to the Austrian state of Salzburg and, marginally, to Styria and to the German state of Bavaria.
The whole range is drained by the Danube river.

SOIUSA classification 
According to SOIUSA (International Standardized Mountain Subdivision of the Alps) the mountain range is an Alpine section, classified in the following way:
 main part = Eastern Alps
 major sector = Northern Limestone Alps
 section = Northern Salzburg Alps
 code = II/B-24

Subdivision 
The range is divided into four Alpine subsections:
 Loferer und Leoganger Steinberge - SOIUSA code:II/B-24.I;
 Salzburger Schieferalpen - SOIUSA code:II/B-24.II;
 Berchtesgadener Alpen - SOIUSA code:II/B-24.III;
 Tennengebirge - SOIUSA code:II/B-24.IV;

Notable summits

Some notable summits of the range are:

References

Mountain ranges of the Alps
Mountain ranges of Bavaria
Mountain ranges of Salzburg (state)
Mountain ranges of Styria